Secret Story - Casa dos Segredos 6 is the sixth season of the Portuguese reality television show Secret Story. It is based on the French version of Secret Story, which itself is based on the international format, Big Brother. The reality show is being broadcast on TVI. The castings were opened on May 21, 2016. The launch was on September 11, 2016. Lasting 112 days, the season ended on December 31, 2016, and Helena was the winner.

Housemates

Amor 
Amor Romeira is 27 and comes from Canary Islands, Spain. She entered the Glass House on Day 50. She was evicted on Day 104.
 Secret: "I am a transsexual woman."

Ana 
Ana Carolina is 22 and comes from Maia. She entered the Main House on Day 1. She was evicted on Day 78.
 Secret: "I am addicted to cosmetic surgeries."

André 
André Silva is 25 and comes from Almada. He entered the Main House on Day 1. He was evicted on Day 15.
 Secret: "I was kidnapped by my own father."

Bruno 
Bruno Pereira is 28 and come from Vila Franca de Xira. He entered the Main House on Day 1. He was evicted on Day 64.
 Secret: "We got married in the launch show of Secret Story 6."

Carla 
Carla Silva is 25 and comes from Ilha de São Miguel. She entered the Main House on Day 1. She became a finalist on Day 99 after winning the second passport to the finale. She finished third on Day 112.
 Secret: "I have a disabling neurological disease."

Catarina 
Catarina Silva is 23 and comes from Matosinhos. She entered the Main House on Day 1. She was evicted on Day 8.
 Secret: "I ran over my own mother and she does not know."

Cláudio 
Cláudio Coelho is 29 and comes from Porto. He entered the Main House on Day 1. He was ejected by "A Voz" with Rita for their disrespectful behavior to "A Voz".
 Secret: "I slept on the bedroom of Cristiano Ronaldo."

Cláudio A. 
Claúdio Alegre is 24 and comes from Quarteira. He entered the Main House on Day 1. He became a finalist on Day 92 after winning the first passport to the finale. He finished fourth on Day 112.
 Secret: "We are a real couple."

Christina 
Christina da Silva is 27, was born in Canada and lives in Açores. She entered the Main House on Day 1. She was evicted on Day 50.
 Secret: "We got married in the launch show of Secret Story 6."

Cristiana 
Cristiana Jesus is 21 and comes from Albufeira. She entered the Main House on Day 1. She was evicted on Day 99.
 Secret: "We are a real couple."

Daniela 
Daniela Filipa is 26 and comes from Vila Nova de Gaia. She entered the Glass House on Day 57. She was evicted on Day 71.
 Secret: "We stayed at the door of the house of Secret Story 6 on Day 1."

Diogo 
Diogo Luís is 25 and comes from Cascais. He entered the Main House on Day 1. He was evicted on Day 108.
 Secret: "I never met my father and I am looking for him."

Diogo S. 
Diogo Semedo is 19 and comes from Elvas. He entered the Main House on Day 1. He became a finalist on Day 108 after surviving the last eviction. He finished as the runner up on Day 112.
 Secret: "I am a national champion in athletics."

Fábio 
Fábio Almeida is 22, was born in Açores and lives in Paio Pires. He entered the Main House on Day 1. He walked on Day 25.
 Secret: "I participated in an exorcism."

Helena 
Helena Isabel Patrício is 29, was born in Ferreira do Alentejo and lives in Lisbon. She entered the Glass House on Day 1. She became a finalist on Day 108 after surviving the last eviction. She finished as the winner of the series on Day 112.
 Secret: "I can not cross the April 25 bridge"

Joel 
Joel Matias is 27 and comes from Switzerland. He entered the Glass House on Day 50. He was evicted on Day 92.
 Secret: "I was a victim of carjacking."

Kika 
Kika Gomes is 22 and comes from Amadora. She entered the Main House on Day 1. She was evicted on Day 36.
 Secret: "I suffer from ichthyophobia."

Luís 
Luís Almeida is 20 and comes from Estoril. He entered the Main House on Day 1. He was evicted on Day 29.
 Secret: "I am the link of all housemates."

Márcio 
Márcio Poças is 25 and comes from Vila Nova de Gaia. He entered the Glass House on Day 57. He was evicted on Day 85.
 Secret: "We stayed at the door of the house of Secret Story 6 on Day 1."

Mariana 
Mariana Almeida is 32 and comes from Switzerland. She entered the Main House on Day 1. She was evicted on Day 43.
 Secret: "I was diagnosed with cancer at 18."

Nuno 
Nuno Jesus is 30 and comes from Vila Nova de Gaia. He entered the Main House on Day 1. Jé was evicted on Day 57.
 Secret: "33,200 people allowed my entry in the house (via app of Secret Story 6)."

Paulo 
Paulo Teixeira is 28 and comes from Marco de Canaveses. He entered the Glass House on Day 1. He was evicted on Day 22.
 Secret: "I play a political role."

Rita 
Rita Rosendo is 27 and comes from Graça. She entered the Main House on Day 1. She was ejected by "A Voz" with Cláudio for their disrespectful behavior to "A Voz".
 Secret: "I took my lover to my wedding."

Tucha 
Jucelina «Tucha» Lourenço is 27, was born in Angola and lives in Lisbon. She entered the Main House on Day 1. She became a finalist on Day 108 after surviving the last eviction. She finished fifth on Day 112.
 Secret: "I already participated in a reality show."

Vanessa 
Vanessa Monteiro is 20 and comes from Paris. She entered the Main House on Day 1, but later that day, she was chosen by Helena and Paulo to went to the Glass House. She was ejected by "A Voz" on Day 15 by revealing her secret to Diogo.
 Secret: "I was born a baby mermaid."

Secrets 

There are 22 secrets in the House for the sixth season.

Nominations table

Notes 
 : On Launch night, Helena and Paulo were sent to the Glass House, as they weren't official housemates. After the entrance of all the housemates, Helena and Paulo chose Vanessa to join them to the Glass House. During Week 1, they have to win challenges to become official housemates.
 : The nominations of Week 1 were done face-to-face. In the first round, the male housemates nominated one female; Mariana was nominated. In the second round, the female housemates nominated one female; Ana was nominated. In the third round, the female and male housemates nominated one female; Catarina and Tucha were nominated.
 : On Day 8, "A Voz" announced that Helena, Paulo and Vanessa won the challenges and they became official housemates. As a reward, each of them had to choose one housemate to go to the Glass House; Helena chose Rita, Paulo chose Diogo S. and Vanessa chose Cristiana.
 : The nominations of Week 2 were done face-to-face. In the first round, the male housemates nominated one male; Diogo was nominated. In the second round, the female housemates nominated one male; André was nominated. In the third round, the female and male housemates nominated one male; Fábio was nominated.
 : On Day 15, Cláudio, Helena and Rita had a dilemma: choosing receive immunity by going to the Glass House or be automatically nominated. They chose to go to the Glass House.
 : The nominations of Week 3 were done face-to-face. In the first round, the male housemates nominated one female with Christina and Cristiana tied with 3 votes each; as the Housemate of the Week, Cláudio A. broke the tie and chose Christina to be nominated. In the second round, the female and male housemates nominated one female; Kika was nominated. In the third round, the female housemates nominated one male; Bruno was nominated. In the fourth round, the female and male housemates nominated one male; Paulo was nominated.
 : On Day 22, several events happened. Cláudio A. was automatically nominated by "A Voz" for break the rules of the nomination during the Live Nominations Show. Thinking that they were automatically nominated him, Ana and Tucha gave immunity to Cláudio. "A Voz" asked who wanted to go to Glass House, and the ones that wanted had to find three objects saying "Glass House"; Ana, Bruno and Diogo, found that objects and they went to the Glass House; however, unlike previous weeks, they did not receive immunity.
 : The nominations of Week 4 were done in the Diary Room. The female housemates nominated two male housemates.
 : On Day 22, Cláudio had a dilemma: to Rita receive immunity, he had to ignore her. If he didn't ignore her, she would be automatically nominated. On Day 24, "A Voz" announced that Cláudio completed the task and Rita received immunity.
 : On Day 29, the housemates were divided into two teams: Cláudio's team (Cláudio, Bruno, Christina, Helena, Kika, Mariana, Nuno and Rita) and Cláudio A.'s team (Cláudio A., Ana, Carla, Cristiana, Diogo, Diogo S., Luís and Tucha). They did two games, won both by Cláudio's team. Cláudio chose Carla, Cristiana and Diogo S. to go to the Glass House. Carla, Cristiana and Diogo S. didn't receive immunity.
 : On Day 29, Bruno and Christina had a dilemma: to receive immunity, Bruno had to get close of Helena and Christina to Nuno. If they didn't get close of them, they would be automatically nominated. On Day 31, "A Voz" announced that Bruno and Christina didn't complete the task and they were automatically nominated.
 : The nominations of Week 5 were done face-to-face. In the first round, the female and male housemates nominated one female with Helena and Kika tied with 7 votes each; as the Housemate of the Week, Diogo S. broke the tie and chose Kika to be nominated. In the second round, the male housemates nominated one female with Helena and Mariana tied with 3 votes each; Diogo S. broke the tie and chose Mariana to be nominated. In the third round, the female housemates nominated one female; Helena was nominated.
 : On Day 36, "A Voz" asked who wanted to go to Glass House. Cláudio, Mariana and Nuno decided to go to the Glass House. On Day 37, Mariana was elected the Housemate of the Week, and she exchanged her place with Cláudio A. in the Glass House.
 : The nominations of Week 6 were done face-to-face. In the first round, the male housemates nominated one female; Cristiana was nominated. In the second round, the female and male housemates nominated one female with Helena and Rita tied with 6 votes each; as the Housemate of the Week, Mariana broke the tie and chose Helena to be nominated. In the third round, the female housemates nominated one female; Rita was nominated. In the fourth round, the female and male housemates nominated one female; Christina and Mariana were nominated.
 : On Day 44, the housemates were divided into two teams for a run task, Tucha's and Ana's teams. Tucha's team won and they decided to send Carla, Diogo and Helena to the Glass House.
 : In Week 7, all the female housemates were nominated, except Cristiana that was in the Secret Room.
 : On Day 50, two new housemates, Amor and Joel, entered the Glass House. Via App of Secret Story 6 until Day 57, the public voted if they wanted them as housemates.
 : Cristiana completed a task and as a reward, Cláudio A. won immunity.
 : The nominations of Week 8 were done face-to-face. In all rounds, everyone nominated anyone: Nuno was nominated in the first, Diogo in the second and Helena in the third.
 : On Day 57, two new housemates, Daniela and Márcio, entered the Glass House. Via App of Secret Story 6 until Day 63, the public voted if they wanted them as housemates.
 : On Day 57, Helena had a dilemma: give immunity to Carla or give her an automatic nomination. She decided to give the automatic nomination to Carla.
 : As new housemates, Amor and Joel received immunity.
 : In Week 9 all the male housemates were nominated, with Carla.
 : To learn more about Portugal, Amor received immunity.
 : Diogo S. and Cláudio A. received immunity because they had the two higher percentages in nominations of Week 9.
 : On Day 65, the three laziest housemates of the House (the ones who got out of bed last) were sent to the Glass House as a punishment (Amor, Diogo S. and Joel).
 : The nominations of Week 10 were done face-to-face. In the first round, the female housemates nominated one male; Márcio was nominated. In the second round, the male housemates nominated one female with Daniela and Tucha tied with 2 votes each; as the Housemate of the Week, Ana broke the tie and chose Daniela to be nominated. In the third round, the female and male housemates nominated anyone; Joel was nominated.
 : On Day 71, Cláudio A. was automatically nominated by Tucha for the insults.
 : On Day 72, Diogo was elected Housemate of the Week and he chose Ana and Tucha to go to the Glass House.
 : The nominations of Week 11 were done face-to-face. In the first round, the female housemates nominated one male; Joel was nominated. In the second round, the male housemates nominated one female; Ana was nominated. In the third round, the female and male housemates nominated anyone; Diogo was nominated.
 : On Day 79, Helena was elected Housemate of the Week and he chose Carla, Diogo and Márcio to go to the Glass House.
 : The nominations of Week 12 were done face-to-face. In the first round, the female housemates nominated one male with Joel and Márcio tied with 2 votes each; as the Housemate of the Week, Helena broke the tie and chose Márcio to be nominated. In the second round, the male housemates nominated one female; Amor was nominated. In the third round, the female and male housemates nominated anyone; Joel was nominated.
 : On Day 86, Cláudio A. was elected Housemate of the Week and he chose Joel and Tucha to go to the Glass House.
 : The nominations of Week 13 were done face-to-face. In all rounds, everyone nominated anyone: Amor was nominated in the first, Joel in the second and Diogo in the third.
 : On Day 92, Cláudio A. received a passport to the final.
 : Helena was nominated by "A Voz" for her bad behavior to Cláudio A.. However, she wasn't nominated along with the other nominees; her nomination was to decide if she stays or leaves the house.
 : Tucha received a double vote in the nominations by winning the "Weight Loss" task.
 : The nominations of Week 14 were done face-to-face. In all rounds, everyone nominated anyone: Carla was nominated in the first, Amor in the second and Cristiana and Diogo in the third.
 : On Day 99, Carla received a passport to the final.
 : The nominations of Week 15 were done in the Diary Room. All housemates nominated two housemates.
 : On Day 104, Diogo, Diogo S., Helena and Tucha were nominated to decide who would be the last three finalists.
 : For the final, the public voted for the housemate they want to win.

Nominations total received

Nominations: results 

 Votes to evict
 Votes to save
 Votes to win

Twists

Main and Glass House 
On this season a new section of the House was created, the Glass House. Located on the backyard, it's a small place where a few housemates (normally 3) will have to live on it and can't leave it exempt on special occasions like eviction shows or nominations. For the first 3 weeks, this section of the House saw its housemates lose their full housemate status, having to perform with success several tasks in order to take it back. Because of this, those housemates are immune and exempt from nominating. However starting from week 4, housemates on the Glass House have a full status like the ones in the Main House and can nominate, they will only have to live there. The Glass House wasn't used anymore since week 14.

 On Day 1, Ana, André, Bruno, Carla, Catarina, Cláudio, Cláudio A., Christina, Cristiana, Diogo, Diogo S., Fábio, Kika, Luís, Mariana, Nuno, Rita and Tucha moved into the Main House, whilst Helena, Paulo and Vanessa moved into the Glass House.
 On Day 8, Helena chose Rita, Paulo chose Diogo S. and Vanessa chose Cristiana to take their places in the Glass House.
 On Day 15, Cláudio, Helena and Rita had a dilemma; choosing receive immunity by going to the Glass House or be automatically nominated. They chose to go to the Glass House.
 On Day 18, "A Voz" decided to make some changes in the Glass House. As Housemate of the Week, Cláudio A. decided to exchange Helena and Rita with Kika. However, due to his bad behaviour Cláudio A. was also exchanged.
 On Day 22, "A Voz" asked who wanted to go to Glass House, and the ones that wanted had to find three objects saying "Glass House"; Ana, Bruno and Diogo, found that objects and they went to the Glass House. However, unlike in previous weeks, they did not receive immunity.
 On Day 25, "A Voz" did some questions about October 5, 1910. Tucha's team missed more questions and she went to the Glass House. Later, she had to choose two teammates to go with her; she chose Christina and Mariana.
 On Day 27, Ana and Cristiana went to the Glass House because of their bad behavior.
 On Day 29, the housemates were divided in two teams: Cláudio's team (Cláudio, Bruno, Christina, Helena, Kika, Mariana, Nuno and Rita) and Cláudio A.'s team (Cláudio A., Ana, Carla, Cristiana, Diogo, Diogo S., Luís and Tucha). They did two games, won both by Cláudio's team. Cláudio chose Carla, Cristiana and Diogo S. to go to the Glass House.
 On Day 36, "A Voz" asked who wanted to go to the Glass House. Cláudio, Mariana and Nuno decided to go to the Glass House. On Day 37, Mariana was elected the Housemate of the Week, and she exchanged her place with Cláudio A. in the Glass House.
 Since Day 41 to 44, the housemates could be in any house.
 On Day 44, the housemates were divided into two teams for a run task, Tucha's and Ana's teams. Tucha's team won and they decided to send Carla, Diogo and Helena to the Glass House.
 On Day 50, two new housemates, Amor and Joel, entered the Glass House.
 From Day 55 to 57, the housemates could be in any house.
 On Day 57, two new housemates, Daniela and Márcio, entered the Glass House.
 On Day 65, the three laziest housemates of the House (the ones who got out of bed last) were sent to the Glass House as a punishment (Amor, Diogo S. and Joel).
 On Day 69, "A Voz" decided to separate the couples, Cláudio A. & Cristiana and Daniela & Márcio; Daniela and Cláudio A. went to the Glass House.
 On Day 72, Diogo was elected Housemate of the Week and he chose Ana and Tucha to go to the Glass House.
 On Day 79, Helena was elected Housemate of the Week and she chose Carla, Diogo and Márcio to go to the Glass House.
 On Day 86, Cláudio A. was elected Housemate of the Week and he chose Tucha and Joel to go to the Glass House.

Housemate of the Week 
Starting on Week 2, a new election normally done on Mondays was implemented in which the housemate elected wins a prominent position in the game that week: the housemate gets to wear a special golden microphone, has several rewards in the House, usually serves as the leader of house work and others related and gets to break the ties at the nominations if they appear, although only if the Housemate of the Week is not involved in that tie. Throughout the weeks the method of election changes, but the most common ones are a vote between the housemates and elections through tasks done by "A Voz". The most times a housemate was elected with this title was 2, being several housemates able to do that (Mariana, Cláudio A., Tucha, Carla and Helena).

Passports to the final 
Like on season 4, two passports to the finals were given (the first on Day 92 and the second on Day 99). The winners of the passports become immune from all evictions and nominations until the finale night, meaning they automatically become finalists.

The first passport was given on the eviction show of December 11 (Day 92). In this case, everyone was eligible to win it exempt the current nominees of Week 13 (Amor, Diogo and Joel) since the weekly eviction hadn't happened yet. For the twist ex-housemates of previous season of the show entered the House to support their favorite housemate and would fight to give the housemate they were representing a passport to the finals. The ex-housemates were: Sofia (SS4) representing Helena, Agnes (SS5) representing Tucha, Cristiana (SS5) representing Cláudio A., Daniel (SS5) representing Carla, Liliana (SS5) representing Cristiana and Pedro (SS5) representing Diogo S. After revealing the reasons they supported that housemate, they went to the backyard to participate in a competition to determine who would win the passport. Several eyes were hidden throughout the House, however only one of them was a red eye. The first ex-housemate to find this red eye would win a passport to his/her representative. Eventually Cristiana (SS5) found the red eye, meaning Cláudio A. won therefore the first passport to the finals.

The second passport was given on the eviction show of December 18 (Day 99). It was revealed that in this case, the current housemates would give this passport by a vote, therefore the housemate with the most votes would win the passport. Once again, everyone was eligible to win the passport except Cláudio A. (who already had his own passport) and Helena (since she was at the time in a separate vote to decide her faite in the game, which means she wasn't technically inside the game at that moment and therefore couldn't also vote). Since the election happened before the eviction, if the housemate that wins the passport is evicted the title goes to the housemate that got the second highest votes. Carla received the most votes and therefore won the second passport to the finals. As she was one of the nominees, Diogo S. had the second highest votes and was still eligible to win it. However, Carla wasn't evicted that night and got to remain with her passport.

Ratings

Live eviction shows 
The live eviction shows air every Sunday at 9:30 pm.

References

External links 
 Official Website 

2016 Portuguese television seasons
06